Cyprian Bazylik (c. 1535 in Sieradz – c. 1600) was a Polish composer, usually designated as C.B. or C.S. (Cyprian of Sieradz). Besides writing music, he was also a writer, poet, and printer.

Recordings
 10 songs, a capella, Bornus Consort, Marcin Bornus-Szczyciński.  
 19 songs, Subtilior Ensemble, Cantilena Sieradz, Ars Nova, director :pl:Jacek Urbaniak

References

1535 births
1600 deaths
16th-century Polish people
16th-century composers
16th-century Polish poets
Renaissance composers
Polish composers
Polish male poets
People from Sieradz
Polish male classical composers